Peekaboo is a form of play primarily played with an infant.

Peekaboo may also refer to:

Film and television
 Peekaboo (film), a 2011 Australian short film
 "Peekaboo" (Breaking Bad), a television episode
 "Peek-a-Boo" (Lego Ninjago: Masters of Spinjitzu), a television episode

Music
 Peekaboo (musician), American freeform bass producer
 Peek-A-Boo Records, an American record company
 Peekaboo (album), by Marsheaux, 2006
 "Peek-a-Boo!", a song by Devo, 1982
 "Peek a Boo" (Lil Yachty song), 2017
 "Peek-a-Boo" (Red Velvet song), 2017
 "Peek-a-Boo" (Siouxsie and the Banshees song), 1988
 "Peek-A-Boo", a song by the Cadillacs, 1958
 "Peek-A-Boo", a song by the New Vaudeville Band, 1967
 "Peek-A-Boo", a song by the Stylistics from Round 2, 1972

Other uses
 Peekaboo Galaxy, a galaxy found behind a passing star
 Peek-a-boo (boxing style), a boxing style
 Peek-a-Boo, a DC Comics supervillain and enemy of the Flash
 Peekaboo, the family cat in the comic strip Rose Is Rose

See also
 Picabo (disambiguation)
 Picaboo, a self-publishing and printing service in Hanover, New Hampshire, U.S.
 Picabu, restaurant at the Walt Disney World Dolphin resort
 See-through clothing, sometimes referred to as "peek-a-boo"
 Peekaboom, a human-based computation game introduced by Luis von Ahn